Cyclotaenia discus is a species of beetle in the family Cerambycidae, and the only species in the genus Cyclotaenia. It was described by the German entomologist Karl Jordan in 1903.

Distribution
Cyclotaenia discus is found in many Central African countries like Cameroon, the Central African Republic, Gabon,  Ivory Coast and Malawi.

References

Pachystolini
Beetles described in 1903
Taxa named by Karl Jordan